Lee Matthews may refer to:

Lee Matthews (footballer) (born 1979), English football player 
Lee Matthews (singer) (born 1988), Irish singer, songwriter